Son Yeo-eun (born Byeon Na-yeon on August 4, 1983) is a South Korean actress. Son was nominated for Best New Actress for Television at the Baeksang Arts Awards for her portrayal of a villain in Thrice Married Woman (2013).

Filmography

Film

Television series

Awards and nominations

References

External links 
 
 
 
  
  
 

1983 births
Living people
21st-century South Korean actresses
South Korean television actresses
South Korean film actresses
People from Busan
Dong-a University alumni